is a retired Japanese judoka who won two Olympic medals during the 1980s.

Biography
Hosokawa began judo in junior-high school, and won the Japanese inter-high school judo competition in 1977. He entered Tenri University in 1978, and continued his success by winning the college-level world judo championship in 1979 and 1980.

After graduating from Tenri University, he began work as a teacher for a school in Nara Prefecture in 1982. He was chosen as the -60 kg representative for the Japanese olympic judo team for the 1984 Summer Olympics, where he won a gold medal by defeating future gold medalist Kim Jae-Yup only 69 seconds into the match. He also won a gold medal at the 1985 World Judo Championships, but retired to concentrate on his work as a teacher. He restarted his judo career in 1987 with a silver medal at the 1987 World Judo Championships, and retired after finishing with a bronze medal at the 1988 Summer Olympics.

Hosokawa has served as an instructor for the Japanese Olympic Committee since April, 1997, where he coached many lightweight judoka, most notably 3-time gold medalist Tadahiro Nomura, whose father was Hosokawa's coach during high school. He also coaches judo at Tenri University, and for the All Japan Judo Federation.

See also
 List of judoka
 List of Olympic medalists in judo

References

External links
 

1960 births
Living people
Japanese male judoka
Judoka at the 1984 Summer Olympics
Judoka at the 1988 Summer Olympics
Olympic judoka of Japan
Olympic gold medalists for Japan
Olympic bronze medalists for Japan
Sportspeople from Hyōgo Prefecture
Olympic medalists in judo
Medalists at the 1988 Summer Olympics
Medalists at the 1984 Summer Olympics
21st-century Japanese people
20th-century Japanese people